In the mathematical field of differential geometry, the Calabi conjecture was a conjecture about the existence of certain kinds of Riemannian metrics on certain complex manifolds, made by . His work, principally an analysis of an elliptic partial differential equation known as the complex Monge–Ampère equation, was an influential early result in the field of geometric analysis.

More precisely, Calabi's conjecture asserts the resolution of the prescribed Ricci curvature problem within the setting of Kähler metrics on closed complex manifolds. According to Chern–Weil theory, the Ricci form of any such metric is a closed differential 2-form which represents the first Chern class. (Some compact complex manifolds admit no Kähler classes, in which case the conjecture is vacuous.)

In the special case that the first Chern class vanishes, this implies that each Kähler class contains exactly one Ricci-flat metric. These are often called Calabi–Yau manifolds. However, the term is often used in slightly different ways by various authors — for example, some uses may refer to the complex manifold while others might refer to a complex manifold together with a particular Ricci-flat Kähler metric.

This special case can equivalently be regarded as the complete existence and uniqueness theory for Kähler–Einstein metrics of zero scalar curvature on compact complex manifolds. The case of nonzero scalar curvature does not follow as a special case of Calabi's conjecture, since the 'right-hand side' of the Kähler–Einstein problem depends on the 'unknown' metric, thereby placing the Kähler–Einstein problem outside the domain of prescribing Ricci curvature. However, Yau's analysis of the complex Monge–Ampère equation in resolving the Calabi conjecture was sufficiently general so as to also resolve the existence of Kähler–Einstein metrics of negative scalar curvature. The third and final case of positive scalar curvature was resolved in the 2010s, in part by making use of the Calabi conjecture.

Outline of the proof of the Calabi conjecture

Calabi transformed the Calabi conjecture into a non-linear partial differential equation of complex Monge–Ampère type, and showed that this equation has at most one solution, thus establishing the uniqueness of the required Kähler metric.

Yau proved the Calabi conjecture by constructing a solution of  this equation using the continuity method. This involves first solving an easier equation, and then showing that a solution to the easy equation can be continuously deformed to a solution of the hard equation. The hardest part of Yau's solution is proving certain a priori estimates for the derivatives of solutions.

Transformation of the Calabi conjecture to a differential equation

Suppose that  is a complex compact manifold with a Kähler form .
By the -lemma, any other Kähler form in the same de Rham cohomology class is of the form

The Calabi conjecture is therefore equivalent to the following problem:

Then there is a smooth real function ; with

This is an equation of complex Monge–Ampère type for a single function .
It is a particularly hard partial differential equation to solve, as it is non-linear in the terms of highest order.

The map from smooth functions to smooth functions taking  to  defined by 

is neither injective nor surjective. It is not injective because adding a constant to  does not change , and it is not surjective because  must be positive and have average value 1. So we consider the map restricted to functions  that are normalized to have average value 0, and ask if this map is an isomorphism onto the set of positive  with average value 1. Calabi and Yau proved that it is indeed an isomorphism. This is done in several steps, described below.

Uniqueness of the solution

Proving that the solution is unique involves showing that if 

then φ1 and φ2 differ by a constant
(so must be the same if they are both normalized to have average value 0). 
Calabi proved this by showing that the average value of

is given by an expression that is at most 0. As it is obviously at least 0, it must be 0, so 

which in turn forces φ1 and φ2 to differ by a constant.

The set of F is open

Proving that the set of possible F is open (in the set of smooth functions with average value 1) involves showing that if it is possible to solve the equation for some F, then it is possible to solve it for all sufficiently close F. Calabi proved this by using the implicit function theorem for Banach spaces: in order to apply this, the main step is to show that the linearization of the differential operator above is invertible.

The set of F is closed
This is the hardest part of the proof, and was the part done by Yau.
Suppose that F is in the closure of the image of possible
functions φ. This means that there is a sequence of 
functions φ1, φ2, ...
such that the corresponding functions F1, F2,...
converge to F, and the problem is to show that some subsequence of the φs converges to a solution φ. In order to do this, Yau finds some a priori bounds for the functions φi and their higher derivatives
in terms of the higher derivatives of log(fi). Finding these bounds requires a long sequence of hard estimates, each improving slightly on the previous estimate. The bounds Yau gets are enough to show that the functions φi all lie in a compact subset of a suitable Banach space of functions, so it is possible to find a convergent subsequence.
This subsequence converges to a function φ with image F, which 
shows that the set of possible images F is closed.

References

Thierry Aubin, Nonlinear Analysis on Manifolds, Monge–Ampère Equations  This gives a proof of the Calabi conjecture and of Aubin's results on Kähler–Einstein metrics.
 This gives a survey of the work of Aubin and Yau.
 

Dominic D. Joyce Compact Manifolds with Special Holonomy (Oxford Mathematical Monographs)  This gives a simplified proof of the Calabi conjecture.

External links

Complex manifolds
Theorems in differential geometry
Conjectures that have been proved